Banjica is a village in the municipality of Čaška, North Macedonia.

Demographics
Toward the end of the 19th and beginning of the 20th centuries, Banjica traditionally was a mixed Orthodox Macedonian and Muslim Albanian village. In the 1960s there were still 4 Muslim Albanian households left in the village.

According to the 2021 census, the village had a total of 119 inhabitants. 

Ethnic groups in the village include:

References

Villages in Čaška Municipality
Albanian communities in North Macedonia